Spring Green is a historic home located near Mechanicsville, Hanover County, Virginia. It was built about 1800 and encompasses an earlier dwelling dated to about 1764. It is a -story, five bay, center hall, single pile frame dwelling in the Federal style. The oldest section includes the hall, east parlor with the old kitchen.  The house sits on a brick foundation, has a gable roof with dormers, and exterior end chimneys. Also on the property is a contributing smokehouse.

It was listed on the National Register of Historic Places in 2002.

References

Houses on the National Register of Historic Places in Virginia
Federal architecture in Virginia
Houses completed in 1800
Houses in Hanover County, Virginia
National Register of Historic Places in Hanover County, Virginia